is a national highway in the Japanese prefecture of Aomori. Route 394 stretches 185 km (115 miles) from National Routes 279 and 338 in Mutsu southwest to National Route 7 in Hirosaki.

Route description

The route has a total length of 185 km (114.95 mi). It travels southwest across Aomori Prefecture connecting the cities of Mutsu and Hirosaki by traveling over the Hakkōda Mountains in the center of the prefecture.

History
National Route 394 was designated as route connecting Mutsu to Aomori in 1982; however, many of the sections of roadway that make up the highway predate this designation, including a bridge along the highway over Lake Ogawara that was built in 1958. Its routing has changed since its designation. In Shichinohe, the road used to parallel National Route 4 and National Route 45 for a short distance until March 2015. In the same town on 27 November 2018, the route was moved slightly to the west to better facilitate the junction between it and the Kamikita Expressway.

Future
Improvements on the highway near the interchange with the Kamikita Expressway continue. A project to straighten a  section of the road north of the junction is planned by the government of Aomori Prefecture.

Major junctions and features
The route lies entirely within Aomori Prefecture. Distance markers reflect distance traveled from the junction with National Route 338 in Rokkasho.

References

National highways in Japan
Roads in Aomori Prefecture